Charles Eric Plane (20 March 1896 – 7 February 1975) was an Australian rules footballer who played with Geelong in the Victorian Football League (VFL).

Notes

External links 

1896 births
1975 deaths
Australian rules footballers from Victoria (Australia)
Geelong Football Club players